Rebecca Bunting is the current Vice-Chancellor of the University of Bedfordshire. She took office on an interim basis in January 2020 and was appointed permanently in October 2020.

She was previously the Vice-Chancellor of Buckinghamshire New University.

Professional experience

Leadership in HE [VC, DVC, PVC, Dean]; Project leadership for language and linguistics [Tempus, DfE]; Director, Higher Education Academy; Director and Vice-Chair, Society for Research into Higher Education to 2013; HEFCE Teaching Excellence and Student Opportunity Committee; Director, Imperial Health Partners; Board member Bucks Business First.

Publications

References

Academics of Buckinghamshire New University
Year of birth missing (living people)
Living people
People associated with Buckinghamshire New University
Fellows of the Higher Education Academy